Ueno is a neighborhood in Taito, Tokyo. 

Ueno may also refer to:

Places
Ueno, Mie, a former city in Mie Prefecture, now part of the city of Iga
Ueno, Gunma, a village in Gunma Prefecture
Ueno, Okinawa, a village in Okinawa Prefecture

Other uses
Ueno (surname)
Ueno, a creative technology services company founded by Icelandic businessman Haraldur Ingi Þorleifsson and sold to Twitter.